Chronological list of houses, commercial buildings and other works by Trost & Trost. 
Refer also to the list of Trost & Trost works by location.

1890s
South Hall, University of Arizona (demolished 1958), 1898; Henry C. Trost, Tucson, Arizona

1900s
*St. Josephs Academy (demolished), 1903; Henry C. Trost; El Paso, Texas
Santa Cruz County Court House, 1904, Nogales, Arizona as Trost & Rust 
W.W. Turney residence (now the International Museum of Art), 1906; El Paso, TX
YMCA (demolished in 1961), 1906–1908; Henry C. Trost; El Paso, TX
First Presbyterian Church (demolished), 1906–1908; Henry C. Trost; El Paso, TX
Manning House, 1907–1908; Henry C. Trost, El Presidio neighborhood; Tucson, Arizona
Henry C. Trost residence 1908; Henry C. Trost; El Paso, TX
James S. Douglas House (now the Douglas Historical Society Museum); Douglas, Arizona; 1908
Vilas School, 1908–1909; Henry C. Trost; El Paso, TX
El Paso Country Club (destroyed by fire in 1916), 1908–1909; Henry C. Trost; El Paso, TX
Caples Building, 1909; Henry C. Trost; El Paso, TX
El Paso Military Institute Dormitory 1909; Henry C. Trost; El Paso, TX
New Mexico State University campus, 1909; Las Cruces, New Mexico
Gardiner / Ramsey House, 1901 Tucson, Arizona; Henry C. Trost
Morenci Club, 1902, Morenci, AZ. Demolished early 1980s
Hotel Morenci, 1902, Morenci, AZ. Demolished early 1908s

1910s

Abdou Building, 1910; Henry C. Trost; El Paso, TX 
Roberts-Banner Building, 1910; Henry C. Trost; El Paso, TX
Rosenwald Building, 1910, Albuquerque, New Mexico
Berthold Spitz House, c. 1910, Albuquerque, New Mexico; Henry C. Trost
Young Women's Christian Association (demolished), 1910; Henry C. Trost; El Paso, TX
Anson Mills Building, 1911; Henry C. Trost; El Paso, TX
Alta Vista School, 1912; Henry C. Trost; El Paso, TX
Masonic Temple (demolished in 1968), 1912; Henry C. Trost; El Paso, TX
Hotel Oregon (demolished), 1912; Henry C. Trost; El Paso, TX
Hotel Paso del Norte, 1912; Henry C. Trost; El Paso, TX
Popular Department Store (now 1 Union Fashion Center), 1912; Henry C. Trost; El Paso, TX
White House Department Store and Hotel McCoy (now The Centre), 1912; Henry C. Trost; El Paso, TX
The Wigwam Theater remodeling, 1912; Henry C. Trost; El Paso, TX
Korricks' Department Store, 1912–3; Henry C. Trost; Phoenix, AZ
Lydia Patterson Institute (demolished in 1963-64), 1913; Henry C. Trost; El Paso, TX
El Paso High School, 1913–1916; Henry C. Trost; El Paso, TX
Temple San Ignacio de Loyola addition, 1913–1922; Gustavus A. Trost; El Paso, TX
Old Albuquerque High School- Main Building, 1914, Albuquerque, New Mexico; Henry C. Trost
Palace Theater-Originally Alhambra Theater, 1914; Henry C. Trost; El Paso, TX
Texas State School of Mines and Metallurgy Assay Office (demolished), 1914; Henry C. Trost; El Paso, TX
Hotel Worth - Hotel Adalante, Raler Hotel, Baker Hotel amongst other names, 1912; Henry C. Trost; El Paso, TX
Deming Armory, 1915–16; Henry C. Trost; Deming, New Mexico
El Paso County Court House (demolished in 1988), 1915–1916; Henry C. Trost; El Paso, TX
Alterations to the Texas Grand Theater Building (demolished 1952), 1916; Henry C. Trost, El Paso, TX
Independent Order of Odd Fellows Lodge#284 (demolished), 1916; Henry C. Trost; El Paso, TX
Occidental Life Building, 1917, Albuquerque, New Mexico
University of Texas at El Paso- Old Main Building, 1917; Henry C. Trost; El Paso, TX
University of Texas at El Paso- Quinn Hall, 1917; Henry C. Trost; El Paso, TX
University of Texas at El Paso- Graham Hall, 1917; Henry C. Trost; El Paso, TX
University of Texas at El Paso- Geology Building, 1917; Henry C. Trost; El Paso, TX
Southern Pacific/Arizona Eastern Railway Depot- Restaurant, Freight office, and Station Buildings, 1910–1916; Globe, Arizona

1920s

Gadsden Hotel (rebuilt 1929 after fire), Historic downtown Douglas, Arizona
University of Texas at El Paso- Kelly Hall, 1920–1921; Henry C. Trost, El Paso, TX
First National Bank Building, 1922, Albuquerque, New Mexico
Houston High School, 1922; Henry C. Trost; El Paso, TX       
Union High School, 1922; Henry C. Trost; Tombstone, Arizona
Morehead School Addition (demolished), 1922; Henry C. Trost; El Paso, TX
State National Bank Building, 1922; Henry C. Trost; El Paso, TX
Hotel Cortez - Hotel Orndorff, 1922; Henry C. Trost; El Paso, TX
Castle Apartments, 1922; Henry C. Trost; Albuquerque, NM
Eller Apartments, 1922; Henry C. Trost; Albuquerque, NM
Franciscan Hotel (demolished), 1923, Albuquerque, New Mexico; Henry C. Trost
Loretto Academy, 1922–1936; Gustavus A. Trost; El Paso, TX
Luhrs Building, 1924, Phoenix, Arizona; Henry C. Trost
Sunshine Building 1924 in Downtown Albuquerque, New Mexico
El Paso Community College 1925; Henry C. Trost; El Paso, TX
Hotel Dieu School of Nursing (demolished), 1925; Henry C. Trost; El Paso, TX
Congregation B' Naizion (destroyed by arson October 13, 1984), 1925; Henry C. Trost; El Paso, TX
Gage Hotel, 1927, Marathon, Texas
Gateway Hotel remodeling, 1927; Henry C. Trost; El Paso, TX
Kerr Mercantile Building, 1927; Sanderson, Texas; Henry C. Trost
Gadsden High School, 1928, Anthony, NM; Henry C. Trost
The Holland Hotel, 1928; Henry C. Trost; Alpine, Texas
NAN Ranch, 1928, Dwyer, New Mexico; Henry C. Trost
St. Josephs Sanatorium (demolished in October 1972), 1928; Henry C. Trost; El Paso, TX
Luhrs Tower, 1929, Phoenix, Arizona; Henry C. Trost
Zach White School, 1929; Gustavus A. Trost; El Paso, TX
El Paso County Hospital remodeling and additions & replacement building (demolished), 1929–1934; Gustavus A. Trost; El Paso, TX

1930s
El Capitan Hotel, 1930, Van Horn, Texas; Henry C. Trost
Driskill Hotel, 1930 tower addition; Henry C. Trost; Austin, Texas
El Paisano Hotel, 1930; Henry C. Trost Marfa, Texas
Fire Station #11, 1930; Gustavus A. Trost; El Paso, TX
Fire Station #10, 1930; Gustavus A. Trost; El Paso, TX
Plaza Hotel (El Paso, Texas) - Plaza Motor Hotel, New Sheldon Hotel, Hilton Hotel amongst other names, 1929; Henry C. Trost; El Paso, TX
O. T. Bassett Tower, 1930; Henry C. Trost; El Paso, TX
Coldwell School, 1930; Gustavus A. Trost; El Paso, TX
E. B. Jones School (demolished), 1930; Gustavus A. Trost; El Paso, TX
Las Cruces Country Club clubhouse, 1930, Las Cruces, New Mexico (demolished 2023).
University of Texas at El Paso- Worrell Hall, 1935–1937; Gustavus A. Trost; El Paso, TX
University of Texas at El Paso- Benedict Hall, 1935–1937; Gustavus A. Trost; El Paso, TX
El Paso Country Club repairs (proposed 1920-1922), 1936; Gustavus A. Trost; El Paso, TX
University of Texas at El Paso- Holliday Hall, 1933; Gustavus A. Trost; El Paso, TX

1940s

 Cooley School Addition, 1941; Gustavus A. Trost; El Paso, TX
 Liberty Hall Theater (demolished in 1987); Henry C. Trost; El Paso, TX

References

Trost